Rukel (Rükəl) is a rural locality (a selo) in Derbentsky District, Republic of Dagestan, Russia. The population was 2,746 as of 2010. The village has an Azerbaijani-majority. There are 31 streets.

Geography
Rukel is located 8 km southwest of Derbent (the district's administrative centre) by road. Dzhalgan and Nizhny Dzhalgan are the nearest rural localities.

References

Rural localities in Derbentsky District